Japan participated in the 1954 Asian Games held in the capital city of Manila, Philippines. This country was ranked 1st with 38 gold medals, 36 silver medals and 24 bronze medals with a total of 98 medals to secure its top spot in the medal tally. Japan sent a total of 151 athletes to the Games, 121 men and 30 women.

Medalists

Medal summary

Medal table

References

Nations at the 1954 Asian Games
1954
Asian Games